RNase PhyM is a type of endoribonuclease which is sequence specific for single stranded RNAs. It cleaves 3'-end of unpaired A and U residues.

External links
 
 

Ribonucleases